Antar Singh Darbar is an Indian politician and a member of the Indian National Congress party from the state of Madhya Pradesh.

Political career
He was an MLA from Mhow Vidhan Sabha constituency two times from 1998 to 2008, before its delimitation in 2008.

.

Political views
He belongs to the Indian National Congress Party.

Personal life
His wife's name is Parwati Singh Darbar. He has a brother named Mansingh Darbar. 
They both have two children.  The name of the elder one is Surendra Singh Darbar and a younger named Raghuveer Singh Darbar and Mansingh Darbar has elder named Bhagwat Singh Darbar and younger named  Ajit Singh Darbar - Surendra Singh Darbar has a son named  Narendra Singh Darbar and Raghuveer, also has a son named Aryaman Singh Darbar and Bhagwat has two daughters, elder named Vedhehi and younger named Vasinavi and Ajit has a son named Manvendra Singh Darbar.

See also
Madhya Pradesh Legislative Assembly
2013 Madhya Pradesh Legislative Assembly election
2008 Madhya Pradesh Legislative Assembly election
2003 Madhya Pradesh Legislative Assembly election
1998 Madhya Pradesh Legislative Assembly election

References

External links

1955 births
Living people
Indian National Congress politicians from Madhya Pradesh